Dharampur State was a princely state in India during the time of the British Raj. Its last ruler acceded to the Union of India 10 June 1948.

Geography

Dharampur State had an area of 1,823 km2 and fell under the Surat Agency of the Bombay Presidency.

History
Dharampur State was founded in 1262. Its capital was moved to Mandvegan in 1766 and was renamed Dharampur. On 31 Dec 1802 Dharampur became a British protectorate. The state was ruled by Sisodhyia dynasty. The rulers had the title Rana Maharana Sahib and were accorded a status of 9-gun salute by the British authorities.

Rulers
Rana Maharana Sahibs

Oct 1680 - 1727            Sahadevji                         (d. 1727)
1727 - 1758                Ramdevji II                       (d. 1758)
1758 - 1774                Dharamdevji                       (d. 1774)
1774 - 1777                Narandevji I (Guman Singh)        (d. 1777)
1774 - 1777                Maharani Baiji Kushal             (d. 1784) Kunverba (f) (1st time) -Regent
1777 - 1784                Somdevji II (Abhay Singh)         (d. 1784)
1777 - 1784                Maharani Baiji Kushal             (s.a.) Kunverba (f) (2nd time) -Regent
1784 - 1807                Rupdevji                          (b. 1783 - d. 1807)
1784 - 1800                Maharani Baiji Kushal Kunverba    (d. af.1808) Sahib (f) -Regent
1807 - 1857                Vijaidevji I                      (d. 1857)
1857 - 20 Jan 1860         Ramdevji III Vijayadevji          (d. 1860)
20 Jan 1860 – 17 Sep 1891  Narayandevji Ramdevji              (b. ... - d. 1891)
1891 - 26 Mar 1921  Mohandevji Narayandevji            (b. 1863 - d. 1921)
26 Mar 1921 – 15 Aug 1947  Vijaidevji Mohandevji              (b. 1884 - d. 1952)
1952 -   Sahadevji Vijaidevji
 Present - Vacant

References

External links
Heraldry of the princely states of Gujarat

Princely states of India
History of Gujarat
Valsad district
13th-century establishments in India
1262 establishments in Asia
1948 disestablishments in India